Papestra is a genus of moths of the family Noctuidae.

Species
 Papestra biren (Goeze, 1781)
 Papestra brenda (Barnes & McDunnough, 1916)
 Papestra cristifera (Walker, 1858)
 Papestra invalida (Smith, 1891)
 Papestra quadrata (Smith, 1891)

References
Natural History Museum Lepidoptera genus database
Papestra at funet

Hadenini